This is a list of Belgian television related events from 1965.

Events

Debuts

Television shows

Ending this year

Births
16 August - Viv Van Dingenen, actress

Deaths